Daniel Palomar is an electrical engineer at the Hong Kong University of Science and Technology (HKUST), in Clear Water Bay, Hong Kong. He was named a Fellow of the Institute of Electrical and Electronics Engineers (IEEE) in 2013 for his contributions to convex optimization-based signal processing for communications.

References

Websites
Daniel Palomar

Fellow Members of the IEEE
Academic staff of the Hong Kong University of Science and Technology
Spanish engineers
Living people
Year of birth missing (living people)